The Symphony No. 5 by Swiss composer Arthur Honegger is a three-movement work for orchestra written in the autumn of 1950. Its subtitle Di tre re (of the three Ds) is a reference to the D (re) played by the solo timpani and basses at the end of each movement. It was commissioned by the Natalie Koussevitzky Foundation and first performed on March 9, 1951, by the Boston Symphony Orchestra under Charles Munch.

Honegger's Fifth Symphony is a three-movement work with a total running time of about 22 minutes. Its three movements are marked:
 Grave (approx. 7'20")
 Allegretto - Adagio - Allegretto - Adagio - Allegretto (approx. 9'00")
 Allegro marcato (approx. 5'30")

This symphony is published by Éditions Salabert.

Recordings 
Recordings of this symphony include full sets of Honegger's five symphonies performed by:
 the Czech Philharmonic Orchestra under Serge Baudo (Supraphon, 1994)
 the Suisse Romande Orchestra under Fabio Luisi (Cascavelle, 2001)
 the Toulouse Capitole Orchestra under Michel Plasson (EMI Classics, 2004)
 the Bavarian Radio Symphony Orchestra under Charles Dutoit (Apex, 2006)

Additional recordings of this symphony include:
 the Boston Symphony Orchestra under Charles Munch (RCA Victor Red Seal and Gold Seal, 1992)
 Orchestre National de France conducted by Charles Munch, recorded June 1964
 the Danish National Symphony Orchestra under Neeme Järvi (Chandos, 1994) 
 the Orchestre Lamoureux under Igor Markevitch (recorded 1957, DG Originals, 1997)
 the Vienna Philharmonic Orchestra under Ernest Ansermet (Andante, 2003)
 the RIAS Symphony Orchestra under Igor Markevitch (Audite, 2010)

References 

Symphony 5
1950 compositions
Music commissioned by Serge Koussevitzky or the Koussevitzky Music Foundation